Anuj Raj (born 1 November 2000) is an Indian cricketer. He made his Twenty20 debut on 15 January 2021, for Bihar in the 2020–21 Syed Mushtaq Ali Trophy. He made his List A debut on 20 February 2021, for Bihar in the 2020–21 Vijay Hazare Trophy.

References

External links
 

2000 births
Living people
Indian cricketers
Bihar cricketers
Place of birth missing (living people)